The director of staff of the United States Space Force (SF/DS) is a position in the United States Space Force held by a lieutenant general. The officeholder oversees the administration and organization of the Office of the Chief of Space Operations, synchronizing policy, plans, positions, procedures, and cross-functional issues within the headquarters staff.

The organizational structure of the Space Force headquarters was first proposed in February 2020 with a director of staff. By July 2020, Major General B. Chance Saltzman was performing the duties in an acting capacity. On July 29, 2020, then-Major General Nina Armagno was nominated for the director of staff position. She was promoted on August 17, 2020, then becoming the inaugural director of staff of the U.S. Space Force.

Organization 
 Director of Staff:  Lt Gen Nina Armagno
 Deputy Director of Staff: Wade S. Yamada

List of directors of staff

Timeline

See also 
 Director of Staff of the United States Air Force
 Space Staff
 United States Space Force

References 

United States Space Force generals
Office of the Chief of Space Operations personnel